James Collins (1895–unknown) was a Scottish footballer who played in the Football League for Swansea Town.

References

1895 births
Scottish footballers
Association football midfielders
English Football League players
Lochee Harp F.C. players
Swansea City A.F.C. players
Year of death missing